Vivek Kane, also known by his pen name Sahaj, is a Gujarati poet, writer and translator from Gujarat, India. His notable works include Anubhuti (2004) and Kathpootali (The puppet; 2010). He was awarded the Shayda Award (for 1999), in January 2000, at Bharatiya Vidyabhavan, Mumbai, for his contribution in Gujarati poetry. He is also the recipient of Bharatratna Dr P V Kane Award (2011) and Mareez Award for poetry (2012).

Early life 
Kane was born on 16 March 1967 in Pune, to Anil Kane and Usha Kane. He is a resident of Vadodara. After taking his primary education from IPCL school, Vadodara, he completed his Std. 12 from A. G. High School, Ahmedabad, in 1984. He received his B. E. (Mechanical) in 1988 from the Maharashtra Institute of Technology, Pune. He also holds an M. B. A. in Finance. Kane married Aparna on 27 January 1994.

Career 
He has served as an expert of the renewable energy and strategic management at national and international companies. His last employment was as Executive Vice President of Zydex Industries, Vadodara.

Works 
His pen name Sahaj means easy, effortless or natural in Gujarati.
He writes in both Gujarati and Urdu. He published his first collection of ghazals Kathpootali (The Puppet) in 2010, which was critically acclaimed by several Gujarati writers and poets including Bhagvatikumar Sharma, Rajesh Vyas 'Miskin', Rashid Meer and Vinod Joshi. He has translated the selected Gujarati poems into Marathi with Mangesh Padganvkar. This work was published as Anubhuti (2004). He has also translated two one-act plays of P. L. Deshpande into Gujarati.

Recognition 
He was awarded the Shayda Award in 1999 for his contribution to Gujarati ghazal poetry. He is also a recipient of Bharatratna P. V. Kane Award (2011) and Mareez Award (2012).

See also
 List of Gujarati-language writers

References

External links
 
https://www.youtube.com/watch?reload=9&v=dKXH3UJqtLw - Poet Vivek Kane 'Sahaj' on Radio Dil, Edison, NJ - Interview Part 1 of 2
https://www.youtube.com/watch?v=3DrER2TMOaM&t=30s - Poet Vivek Kane 'Sahaj' on Radio Dil, Edison, NJ - Interview Part 2 of 2
http://www.kaneconsult.in/
https://www.constructionworld.in/articles/material-advantage/Nanotech-roads/12029
https://www.business-standard.com/article/companies/zydex-eyes-rs-150-crore-orders-for-green-roads-this-fiscal-114011200332_1.html
https://economictimes.indiatimes.com/industry/indl-goods/svs/construction/zydex-eyes-rs-150-crore-orders-for-green-roads-this-fiscal/articleshow/28703795.cms
https://www.youtube.com/watch?v=j-ABbENJCto&t=885s - Leadership Development Workshop - Keynote address by Vivek Kane - Executive Vice President, Zydex
https://www.youtube.com/watch?reload=9&v=ltVtM0EtvVk - Vivek Kane 'Sahaj' enthralls audience yet again @ Bharatiya Vidyabhavan, Chaupati, Mumbai - 17/11/19
https://www.youtube.com/watch?v=j2ym8KLJUjU - Vivek Kane 'Sahaj' takes the audience by storm at Ahmedabad 27Sep2019
https://www.youtube.com/watch?v=iMAwi2Wb770 - Poet Vivek Kane 'Sahaj' takes the audience through a captivation journey in the program "Ek Kavi Ek Saanj" - Solo Poetry Recitation at Vadodara, India on 25 April 2014

Gujarati-language writers
Gujarati-language poets
1967 births
People from Vadodara district
Living people
Writers from Pune
Translators from Gujarati